The Tančík vz. 33 was a Czechoslovak-designed tankette used mainly by Slovakia during World War II. Seventy-four were built. The Germans seized forty when they occupied Bohemia-Moravia in March 1939; there is no record of their use. The Slovak Republic inherited thirty at the same time when it declared independence from Czechoslovakia. In Slovak service it only saw combat during the Slovak National Uprising.

Description 
The Tančík vz. 33 was assembled from a framework of steel "angle iron" beams, to which armor plates were riveted. The gunner sat on the left and had a similar vision port half the size of the driver's. His ZB vz. 26 machine gun was mounted in a ball mount directly to his front. There were similar vision ports on the sides and the rear. The driver's machine gun was fixed and he fired it using a Bowden cable; 2,600 rounds were stored for the machine guns.

The , water-cooled, inline 4-cylinder Praga engine sat in the fighting compartment. One  fuel tank was located to the left of the engine. The transmission had four forward gears and one reverse gear. Transmission, reduction gear, differential, driving shafts and brakes were all taken from the Praga AN truck.

The suspension was a modified version of that used in the Carden-Loyd tankettes. It consisted of two small road wheels fastened together on a frame, two frames paired and sprung by leaf springs that made a wheel carrier, one wheel carrier per side. The track was guided by wooden, metal-lined frames. It had a ground pressure of only 0.5 kg/cm2.

Development 
The Czechoslovakian Army bought three Carden-Loyd tankettes and a production license for them in 1930, Českomoravská Kolben-Daněk building four copies that same year as prototypes for future orders. The Carden-Loyds were evaluated during the Fall maneuvers and revealed numerous problems: the crews had very poor vision through the narrow slits, the machine gun had a very narrow field of fire, and the crewmen had a difficult time communicating. Furthermore, they were slow, underpowered and often broke down. One of the P-1 prototypes was rebuilt to address these issues with additional vision ports in all directions, internal ammunition storage and the machine gun's field of fire increased to 60°. It was extensively tested during 1931—1932 and a few other changes were made as a result. Two of the other prototypes were rebuilt to the same standard; all three were officially accepted by the Army on 17 October 1933. The other prototype was eventually given to the Shah of Iran. The order for seventy was placed on 19 April 1933, all being delivered by October 1934.

Operational history

Czechoslovakia
The 1934 Fall maneuvers validated the misgivings of many in the Army. The driver could not use his machine gun in addition to driving the vehicle. The vehicle had trouble negotiating the terrain, and proved unsuitable for reconnaissance because, while "buttoned-up", the crew could only see the road ahead of them. The lack of a radio made coordination among vehicles in a platoon or larger-sized formation impossible.

While used as a substitute for the light tanks not yet in service during 1934–1936, the Army decided to organize them in three-vehicle platoons, and assigned them to support units in the border areas. These platoons were heavily used suppressing the protests and violence instigated by Konrad Henlein's Sudeten German Party (Sudetendeutsche Partei - SdP) and the Sudetendeutsche Freikorps (paramilitary groups trained in Germany by SS-instructors) between May and October 1938. They were also used to repel Hungarian and Polish border-crossers, sometimes up to a battalion in strength. They helped to screen the infantry when they had to evacuate southern Slovakia after the First Vienna Award on 2 November 1938.

Germany
The Germans captured forty Tančík vz. 33s when they occupied Czechoslovakia, but there is no record of their use so they were presumably quickly scrapped or relegated to training duties.

Slovakia
The thirty Tančík vz. 33s formed one platoon in the Armored Battalion "Martin" formed by the Slovak Army in mid-1939, but they were relegated to training duties during 1940. They saw some use by the insurgents when the Slovak National Uprising began in September 1944, but little is known of their activities.

See also
Skoda MU-4

Notes

References

External links
 Slovak vehicles on Tanks!
 Útočná vozba - Tč vz.33
 Tančík (Tankette) Tč vz. 33 (czech)

Light tanks of Czechoslovakia
World War II tankettes
Military vehicles introduced in the 1930s
Tankettes of the interwar period